Monkhill is an area of Pontefract, in the Wakefield district, in the English county of West Yorkshire. It was the site of the former Pontefract Priory which was founded in the late 11th century and was dissolved in the 1530s.

Amenities
Monkhill has two post offices, a school and a railway station called Pontefract Monkhill.

References
West Yorkshire A-Z

Populated places in West Yorkshire
Former civil parishes in West Yorkshire
Pontefract